Mike Little is an English web developer.

Mike or Michael Little may also refer to:

Mike Little (ice hockey) (born 1987), American ice hockey defenseman
Michael Little, New Zealand rugby union player